Duliby is a village (selo) located along the Stryi River in Stryi Raion (district) of Lviv Oblast (province) in  Western Ukraine. It hosts the administration of Hrabovets-Duliby rural hromada, one of the hromadas of Ukraine. 
The population of the village is about 3 671 people. Local government is administered by Dulibivska village council.

Geography 

History 
The first mention recorded in the court documents dated 1463.

Cult constructions and religion 
Church of St. George 1923 (Wooden) and church of the Transfiguration (stone) is in the village.

Gallery

Famous people 
 Ostap Nyzhankivsky (1862 - 1919) – a  priest of the UGCC, composer, conductor, and civic leader. In Duliby studied in elementary school. In 1900 he worked as a pastor-administrator. In 1919 he was shot by the Polish authorities.
 Lev Shankovsky (1903 - 1995) – Ukrainian military historian and former UPA soldier. Born in the village Duliby.
 Michael Datsyshyn (November 20, 1914 - December 14, 1993) – village pastor Ukrainian Greek Catholic Church from 1964 to 1993.

References

External links 
 Дуліби - Неофіційна сторінка м. Стрий 
 weather.in.ua
 Сайт громади с. Дуліби

Literature 
 

Villages in Stryi Raion